Benjamin Franklin Shively (March 20, 1857 – March 14, 1916) was an American politician and lawyer who served as a United States Representative (1884 to 1885 and 1887 to 1893) and Senator (1909 to 1916) from Indiana.

Biography

Early life, education, and career
Shively was born on a farm near Osceola, Indiana, to Rev. Joel Shively and Elizabeth (née Pendleton) Shively. Joel Shively was the son of Rev. George Shively, who arrived in Indiana in 1864 after living in Washington County, Pennsylvania, and Stark County, Ohio. Elizabeth Pendleton was a native of Somerset County, Pennsylvania.

Benjamin Shively attended the common schools and the Northern Indiana Normal School at Valparaiso. After considering a career as a carpenter, Shively taught school from 1874 to 1880. From 1880 to 1884, Shively edited the Era, a newspaper in St. Joseph County. He was secretary of the National Anti-Monopoly Association in 1883. In 1884 he was president of the board of Indiana University and was elected as a National Anti-Monopolist to the Forty-eighth Congress to fill the vacancy caused by the resignation of William H. Calkins, serving from December 1, 1884, to March 3, 1885.

Shively graduated from the Law School of the University of Michigan at Ann Arbor in 1886, was admitted to the bar, and commenced practice in South Bend, Indiana.

Congressional service
He was elected as a Democrat to the Fiftieth, Fifty-first, and Fifty-second Congresses, serving from March 4, 1887, to March 4, 1893; he was not a candidate for renomination in 1892, and resumed the practice of law in South Bend. He was an unsuccessful Democratic candidate for Governor of Indiana in 1896, and was an unsuccessful candidate for election in 1906 to the Sixtieth Congress; in 1909 he was elected to the U.S. Senate, was reelected in 1914 and served from March 4, 1909, until his death. While in the Senate he was chairman of the Committee on Pacific Railroads (Sixty-second Congress) and a member of the Committee on Pensions (Sixty-third and Sixty-fourth Congresses).

Shively came to prominence in the Senate as chairman of the Committee on Foreign Relations. Shively personally advised President Woodrow Wilson on the situation in Mexico during the Mexican Revolution. Shively was a noted political ally and vocal supporter of the Wilson administration.

Personal life and death
In 1888, Shively married Laura Jenks, daughter of George A. Jenks, the former Solicitor General of the United States under President Grover Cleveland. They had thee children: George, John, and Mary.

Shively was a trustee of Indiana State University in Terre Haute. He was also an Elk.

Shively died in Washington, D.C., and was interred in the Brookville Cemetery, Brookville, Pennsylvania. Vice President Thomas R. Marshall and Second Lady Lois Irene Marshall attended Shively's funeral. President Wilson sent Laura Shively a letter expressing his condolences. Indiana Governor Samuel M. Ralston appointed Thomas Taggart to fill Shively's vacant Senate seat.

See also

List of United States Congress members who died in office (1900–49)

References

Benjamin F. Shively, late a representative from Indiana, Memorial addresses delivered in the House of Representatives and Senate frontispiece 1917

External links
 
 

1857 births
1916 deaths
Valparaiso University alumni
Anti-Monopoly Party members of the United States House of Representatives
Democratic Party United States senators from Indiana
People from St. Joseph County, Indiana
University of Michigan Law School alumni
Democratic Party members of the United States House of Representatives from Indiana
19th-century American politicians